Scheffau am Tennengebirge is a municipality in the Hallein district of Salzburg, Austria.

Geography
The municipality of Scheffau am Tennengebirge lies in the southern Tennengau of the Salzburger Land. The River Lammer flows through its territory. Its subordinate parishes are: Unterscheffau, Oberscheffau, Voregg, Wallingwinkl, Weitenau. Its Katastralgemeinden are Scheffau, Voregg und Weitenau.

The centre of the municipality is in the Lammer valley in Unterscheffau and Oberscheffau.

References

Tennen Mountains
Cities and towns in Hallein District